Darío Zacarías Capuchino (born 14 August 1971) is a Mexican politician affiliated with the PRI. As of 2013 he served as Deputy of the LXII Legislature of the Mexican Congress representing the State of Mexico.

References

1971 births
Living people
Politicians from the State of Mexico
Institutional Revolutionary Party politicians
21st-century Mexican politicians
Municipal presidents in the State of Mexico
Members of the Congress of the State of Mexico
Deputies of the LXII Legislature of Mexico
Members of the Chamber of Deputies (Mexico) for the State of Mexico